Falling Home is the fifth solo album from the singer/songwriter Jude Cole. Released in 2000, thirteen years after his self-titled debut solo album. This album was not released through a record label and is the only album released by Jude Cole independently.

Track listing
 "My Friend Stan" (0:51)      
 "I Won't Bleed" (3:49)    
 "Braking Wheels" (4:15)
 "Leave Me Alone" (5:11)
 "Falling Home" (4:52)
 "Any Dark Day" (4:49)     
 "More Than A Breakup Song" (3:21)
 "Somewhere" (3:39)
 "Raining On The Moon" (3:54)
 "You Make It Easy" (4:49)
 "Inhale" (3:23)
 "Peaceful In Mine" (3:45)

References

2000 albums
Jude Cole albums